Martin Clark Faga (born June 11, 1941) was the tenth director of the National Reconnaissance Office (DNRO).
 
Faga directed the declassification of the existence of the NRO following more than 30-years of secrecy. He revolutionized NRO support to the military, downgraded NRO products' classification, and appointed a deputy director for military support. Faga initiated the transition from separate Central Intelligence Agency, Air Force, and Navy programs into functional directorates of signals, imagery, and communications.

Born and raised in Bethlehem, Pennsylvania, Faga graduated from Liberty High School in June 1959. He then attended Lehigh University, graduating with a B.S. degree in electrical engineering in June 1963 and then earning an M.S. degree in electrical engineering in October 1964.

Faga concurrently served as Assistant Secretary of the Air Force for Space from 1989 to 1993, having been confirmed by the U.S. Senate on September 22, 1989.

Faga is a Fellow of the National Academy of Public Administration.

References

External links
National Reconnaissance Office: Directors List

1941 births
Living people
People from Bethlehem, Pennsylvania
Liberty High School (Bethlehem, Pennsylvania) alumni
Lehigh University alumni
American electrical engineers
United States Air Force civilians
Directors of the National Reconnaissance Office
Recipients of the National Intelligence Distinguished Service Medal
George H. W. Bush administration personnel
Clinton administration personnel